The Ohm Hills are a small range of hills up to  high and about 50 km² in area. They are part of the Lower Eichsfeld region and are located in the county of Eichsfeld, North Thuringia, Germany.

Geography 
The Ohm Hills, most of which are densely wooded, whose southeastern foothills form the Bleicherode Hills, lie in the county of Eichsfeld on its boundary with Nordhausen. They are located between Weißenborn-Lüderode to the north, Bleicherode to the southeast, Worbis to the south and Teistungen to the west, and extend from the upper reaches of the River Helme in the north to the Wipper in the south. To the north and west the range is adjoined by historic landscape of the Lower Eichsfeld (Untereichsfeld), further south is the ridge of the Dün and to the southwest the Eichsfeld-Hainich-Werra Valley Nature Park.

Natural region classification 
According to "Kassel map" of the natural regional classification of Germany the Ohm Hills are grouped as follows:
(to 37 Weser-Leine Uplands, Lower Saxon Hills)
(375 Lower Eichsfeld)
375.2 Ohm Hills and Bleicherode Hills

The Thuringian State office for the Environment and Geology uses a rather coarser, self-published, region classification, within which the landscape of "Ohm Hills-Bleicherode Hills" is enclosed by the landscape unit "North Thuringian Buntsandstein Land".

The muschelkalk ridges of the Ohm Hills and Bleicherode Hills are shown in both classifications as one contiguous natural region. They appear as a continuation of the hills fringing the northwestern perimeter of the Thuringian Basin interrupted only by the Lower Eichsfeld lowland.

Neighbouring natural regions listed clockwise are:
 Lower Eichsfeld including the Eichsfeld Bowl (Eichsfelder Kessel) to the south and the Zehnsberg to the west
 Eichsfeld Basin (Eichsfelder Becken) with the Duderstadt Basin to the northwest and the hill country of the Hellberge to the north
 Silkerode Hills on the far side of the Geroder Eller to the northeast
 North Thuringian Hills to the east

Hills 

The following hills and high points belong to the Ohm Hills in its narrower sense and its foothills to the north and east, which are considered part of neighbouring natural regions, with elevations in metres above sea level (NN):
 Birkenberg (533.4 m), highest point of the Ohm Hills and a good lookout point north of Kaltohmfeld
 Bornberg (529.7 m), north of Kirchohmfeld
 Ohmberg (528.7 m), west of Hauröden
 Kälberberg (524.7 m), south of Kaltohmfeld
 Oberberg (496.5 m)
 Mittelberg (449.9 m)
 Ochsenberg (514.6 m), west of Kaltohmfeld
 Sonder (512.9 m), south of Holungen
 Trogberg (502.9 m), southeast of Wehnde
 Oberberg (496.5 m), northeast of Worbis
 Schwarzenberg (491.4 m), southeast of Brehme
 Hasenburg (487.4 m), southeast of Zeugenberg, north of Buhla
 Sonnenstein (485.6 m), northwest of Holungen
 Mittelberg (475.8 m), further north of Wintzingerode
 Heinrichsberg (478.4 m), northwest of Kirchohmfeld
 Himberg (474.0 m), west of Haynrode
 Mittelberg (465.9 m), between Kaltohmfeld und Breitenworbis
 Fernstein (464.0 m), east of Ferna
 Langenberg (462.6 m), north of Kirchworbis
 Ziegenrück (460,8 m), highest point of in the Bleicherode Hills, south of Buhla
 Haferberg (460.7 m), east of Kirchohmfeld
 Krantberg (455,6 m), north of Holungen
 Haarburg (453.1 m), southeastern Zeugenberg, southeast of Haynrode
 Wehenberg (440.8 m)
 Kanstein (435,5 m), northwest of Worbis
 Rottersberg (420.6 m), northwest of Worbis
 Winkelberg (415.2 m), east of Jützenbach
 Die Hardt (400,9 m), north of Worbis
 Großer Heuberg (389.0 m), northwest of Bischofferode
 Steinberg (385.8 m), eastern spur, west of Werningerode (municipality of Steinrode)
 Buchenberg (383.5 m), northeast of Brehme
 Bauerberg (361.6 m), eastern spur, east of Werningerode (boundary with county of Nordhausen)
 Stadtberg (351.2 m), northern spur, southwest of Jützenbach
 Hühnerberg (349.9 m), eastern spur, south of Bischofferode
 Sommerberg (342.1 m), northern spur, north of Brehme
 Nonnecke (338.5 m), northwestern spur, west of Wehnde

Rivers and streams 
The rivers and streams in the Ohm Hills include the:
 Hahle, rises at the southern edge of the Ohm Hills in Worbis, passes to the south, southern tributary of the Rhume
 Helme, rises in the northern foothills of the Ohm Hills, leaves them head east, western tributary of the Unstrut
 Wipper, rises on the southern edge of the Ohm Hills in Worbis, passes them to the east, western tributary of the Unstrut
 Bode, rises in the Ohm Hills, leaves them heading east, southwestern tributary of the Wipper

The Elbe-Weser Watershed runs through the Ohm Hills. Whilst the Hahle is part of the catchment area of the Leine and Weser rivers, the Bode, Helme and Wipper are in the Elbe's drainage basin.

Settlements 
The settlements in and on the edge of the Ohm Hills include:

 Bischofferode (in the north)
 Bleicherode (südeast)
 Breitenworbis (south)
 Brehme
 Buhla (in the central south)
 Ecklingerode (northwest)
 Ferna (southwest)
 Großbodungen (in the northeast)
 Haynrode (in the central south)
 Holungen (in the north)
 Kehmstedt (east)
 Kaltohmfeld (in the centre)
 Kirchohmfeld (in the centre)
 Kirchworbis (south)
 Kraja (in the east)
 Neustadt (in the northeast)
 Sollstedt (südeast)
 Trebra (nordeast)
 Tastungen (west)
 Teistungen (west)
 Weißenborn-Lüderode (north)
 Wehnde (west)
 Wintzingerode (south)
 Wülfingerode (east)
 Worbis (south-southwest)

References

External links 

 BfN Landscape fact file

Central Uplands
Hills of Thuringia
Forests and woodlands of Thuringia
Eichsfeld (district)